Quisiera may refer to: 

Quisiera, 1989 album by Emmanuel
the song from the album
"Quisiera", 1994 song by Ricardo Montaner
"Quisiera", 1998 by Juan Luis Guerra from the album Ni es lo mismo ni es igual
"Quisiera", 2003 song by Kiruba from the album Kiruba (album)